Chionodes perpetuella is a moth of the family Gelechiidae. It is found in France, Germany, Austria, Switzerland, Italy and Slovenia.

References

Moths described in 1854
Chionodes
Moths of Europe